The International Union of Elevator Constructors (IUEC) is a trade union in the United States and Canada that represents members who construct, modernize, repair, and service elevators, escalators, moving walkways, and other conveyances. The IUEC claims a membership of over 25,000.

The IUEC is a bargaining unit for its members who in turn pay quarterly dues to compensate for the representation. There are various locals throughout the United States and Canada made up of members from the same geographic areas. In conjunction with union employers, the union administers the National Elevator Industry Health Benefit Plans to offer pension benefits and healthcare.

Frank J. Christensen currently serves as the General President.

See also
 Montanile v. Board of Trustees of Nat. Elevator Industry Health Benefit Plan

Notes

External links
 
 

Elevators
Trade unions in the United States
Trade unions in Canada
AFL–CIO
Building and construction trade unions
Columbia, Maryland